Ilford South is a constituency created in 1945 represented in the House of Commons of the UK Parliament since 2019 by Sam Tarry of the Labour Party.

Constituency profile
The seat covers Ilford town centre and the surrounding suburbs, and the housing is predominantly semi-detached with little high-rise development. There is significant commuting to central London via the four stations on the Elizabeth line. The seat is ethnically diverse including white, black and Asian communities.

Political history
 
This constituency was created in 1945. The previous MP since 1992, Mike Gapes, who before defecting to Change UK, was the fourth Labour Party MP, each of whose tenures was interspersed or preceded by one of a Conservative MP serving the area. Despite its record of MPs elected, under Gapes's tenure Ilford South became a very safe seat for the Labour Party; in every election since 1997 it has been won by a majority of over 20% by Labour, and in 2017 they secured over 75% of the vote in the constituency.

The 2015 result made the seat the 38th safest of Labour's 232 seats by percentage of majority.  The narrowest result since 1997 (inclusive) was in 2005 at a majority of 21.6%; the 2017 majority is the greatest ever achieved in the seat, at 54.9%.

Boundaries 

1945–1950: The Municipal Borough of Ilford wards of Clementswood, Cranbrook, Goodmayes, Loxford, and Park.

1950–1974: The Municipal Borough of Ilford wards of Clementswood, Cranbrook, Goodmayes, Loxford, Mayfield, and Park.

1974–1983: The London Borough of Redbridge wards of Clementswood, Cranbrook, Goodmayes, Ilford, Mayfield, and Park.

1983–1997: As above substituting Ilford and Park with reshaped wards Loxford, Newbury, and Valentines.

1997–present: As above plus Chadwell and Seven Kings wards.

Members of Parliament

Election results

Elections in the 2010s

Elections in the 2000s

Elections in the 1990s

Elections in the 1980s

Elections in the 1970s

Elections in the 1960s

Elections in the 1950s

Elections in the 1940s

See also 
 List of parliamentary constituencies in London

Notes

References

External links 
Politics Resources (Election results from 1922 onwards)
Electoral Calculus (Election results from 1955 onwards)

Politics of the London Borough of Redbridge
Parliamentary constituencies in London
Constituencies of the Parliament of the United Kingdom established in 1945
Ilford